Cenchrus echinatus is a species of grass known by the common names southern sandbur, spiny sandbur, southern sandspur, and in Australia, Mossman River grass. It is native to North and South America.

The ligule is a fringe of hairs.

In Australia it forms an invasive weed in coastal situations.

Ecology
The species is invasive in New Caledonia, Tahiti, and Rarotonga.

References

echinatus
Grasses of North America
Grasses of South America
Biota of Clipperton Island
Plants described in 1753
Taxa named by Carl Linnaeus